Brandenburg, officially the State of Brandenburg (German: Land Brandenburg; Low German: Land Brannenborg), is a state in the northeast of Germany bordering the states of Mecklenburg-Vorpommern, Lower Saxony, Saxony-Anhalt, and Saxony, as well as the country of Poland. With an area of 29,480 square kilometres (11,382 square miles) and a population of 2.5 million residents, it is the fifth-largest German state by area and the tenth-most populous. Potsdam is the state capital and largest city, and other major towns are Cottbus, Brandenburg an der Havel and Frankfurt (Oder).

Brandenburg surrounds the national capital and city-state of Berlin, and together they form the Berlin/Brandenburg Metropolitan Region, the third-largest metropolitan area in Germany with a total population of about 6.2 million. There was an unsuccessful attempt to unify both states in 1996 and the states cooperate on many matters to this day.

Brandenburg originated in the Northern March in the 900s AD, from areas conquered from the Wends. It later became the Margraviate of Brandenburg, a major principality of the Holy Roman Empire. In the 15th century, it came under the rule of the House of Hohenzollern, which later also became the ruling house of the Duchy of Prussia and established Brandenburg-Prussia, the core of the later Kingdom of Prussia. From 1815 to 1947, Brandenburg was a province of Prussia.

Following the abolition of Prussia after World War II, Brandenburg was established as a state by the Soviet Military Administration in Germany, and became a state of the German Democratic Republic in 1949. In 1952, the state was dissolved and broken up into multiple regional districts. Following German reunification, Brandenburg was re-established in 1990 and became one of the five new states of the Federal Republic of Germany.

The origin of the name Brandenburg is believed to be West Slavic "Brani Boru", meaning "War Forest".

History

In late medieval and early modern times, Brandenburg was one of seven electoral states of the Holy Roman Empire, and, along with Prussia, formed the original core of the German Empire, the first unified German state. Governed by the Hohenzollern dynasty from 1415, it contained the future German capital Berlin. After 1618 the Margraviate of Brandenburg and the Duchy of Prussia were combined to form Brandenburg-Prussia, which was ruled by the same branch of the House of Hohenzollern. In 1701 the state was elevated as the Kingdom of Prussia. Franconian Nuremberg and Ansbach, Swabian Hohenzollern, the eastern European connections of Berlin, and the status of Brandenburg's ruler as prince-elector together were instrumental in the rise of that state.

Early Middle Ages

Brandenburg is situated in territory known in antiquity as Magna Germania, which reached to the Vistula river. By the 7th century, Slavic peoples are believed to have settled in the Brandenburg area. The Slavs expanded from the east, possibly driven from their homelands in present-day Ukraine and perhaps Belarus by the invasions of the Huns and Avars. They relied heavily on river transport. The two principal Slavic groups in the present-day area of Brandenburg were the Hevelli in the west and the Sprevane in the east.

Beginning in the early 10th century, Henry the Fowler and his successors conquered territory up to the Oder River. Slavic settlements such as Brenna (Brandenburg an der Havel), Budusin (Bautzen), and Chośebuz (Cottbus) came under imperial control through the installation of margraves. Their main function was to defend and protect the eastern marches. In 948 Emperor Otto I established margraves to exert imperial control over the pagan Slavs west of the Oder River. Otto founded the Bishoprics of Brandenburg and Havelberg. The Northern March was founded as a northeastern border territory of the Holy Roman Empire. However, a great uprising of Wends drove imperial forces from the territory of present-day Brandenburg in 983. The region returned to the control of Slavic leaders.

Late Middle Ages

During the 12th century, the German kings and emperors re-established control over the mixed Slav-inhabited lands of present-day Brandenburg, although some Slavs like the Sorbs in Lusatia adapted to Germanization while retaining their distinctiveness. The Roman Catholic Church brought bishoprics which, with their walled towns, afforded protection from attacks for the townspeople. With the monks and bishops, the history of the town of Brandenburg an der Havel, which was the first center of the state of Brandenburg, began.

In 1134, in the wake of a German crusade against the Wends, the German magnate, Albert the Bear, was granted the Northern March by the Emperor Lothar III. He formally inherited the town of Brandenburg and the lands of the Hevelli from their last Wendish ruler, Pribislav, in 1150. After crushing a force of Sprevane who occupied the town of Brandenburg in the 1150s, Albert proclaimed himself ruler of the new Margraviate of Brandenburg. Albert, and his descendants the Ascanians, then made considerable progress in conquering, colonizing, Christianizing, and cultivating lands as far east as the Oder. Within this region, Slavic and German residents intermarried. During the 13th century, the Ascanians began acquiring territory east of the Oder, later known as the Neumark (see also Altmark).

In 1320, the Brandenburg Ascanian line came to an end, and from 1323 up until 1415 Brandenburg was under the control of the Wittelsbachs of Bavaria, followed by the Luxembourg Dynasties. Under the Luxembourgs, the Margrave of Brandenburg gained the status of a prince-elector of the Holy Roman Empire. In the period 1373–1415, Brandenburg was a part of the Bohemian Crown. In 1415, the Electorate of Brandenburg was granted by Emperor Sigismund to the House of Hohenzollern, which would rule until the end of World War I. The Hohenzollerns established their capital in Berlin, by then the economic center of Brandenburg.

16th and 17th centuries

Brandenburg converted to Protestantism in 1539 in the wake of the Protestant Reformation, and generally did quite well in the 16th century, with the expansion of trade along the Elbe, Havel, and Spree rivers. The Hohenzollerns expanded their territory by co-rulership since 1577 and acquiring the Duchy of Prussia in 1618, the Duchy of Cleves (1614) in the Rhineland, and territories in Westphalia. The result was a sprawling, disconnected country known as Brandenburg-Prussia that was in poor shape to defend itself during the Thirty Years' War.

Beginning near the end of that devastating conflict, however, Brandenburg enjoyed a string of talented rulers who expanded their territory and power in Europe. The first of these was Frederick William, the so-called "Great Elector", who worked tirelessly to rebuild and consolidate the nation. He moved the royal residence to Potsdam. At the Peace of Westphalia, his envoy Joachim Friedrich von Blumenthal negotiated the acquisition of several important territories such as Halberstadt. Under the Treaty of Oliva Christoph Caspar von Blumenthal (son of the above) negotiated the incorporation of the Duchy of Prussia into the Hohenzollern inheritance.

Kingdom of Prussia and German Empire

When Frederick William died in 1688, he was followed by his son Frederick, third of that name in Brandenburg. As the lands that had been acquired in Prussia were outside the boundaries of the Holy Roman Empire, Frederick assumed (as Frederick I) the title of "King in Prussia" (1701). Although his self-promotion from margrave to king relied on his title to the Duchy of Prussia, Brandenburg was still the most important portion of the kingdom. However, this combined state is known as the Kingdom of Prussia.

Brandenburg remained the core of the Kingdom of Prussia, and it was the site of the kingdom's capitals, Berlin and Potsdam. When Prussia was subdivided into provinces in 1815, the territory of the Margraviate of Brandenburg became the Province of Brandenburg, again subdivided into the government region of Frankfurt and Potsdam. In 1881, the City of Berlin was separated from the Province of Brandenburg. However, industrial towns ringing Berlin lay within Brandenburg, and the growth of the region's industrial economy brought an increase in the population of the province. After Germany's defeat in World War II, the Neumark, the part of Brandenburg east of the Oder–Neisse line, even absent any Polish-speaking population in this area, became part of Poland. The entire population of former East Brandenburg was expelled en masse. The remainder of the province became a state in the Soviet Zone of occupation in Germany when Prussia was dissolved in 1947.

East Germany 

After the foundation of East Germany in 1949, Brandenburg formed one of its component states. The State of Brandenburg was completely dissolved in 1952 by the Socialist government of East Germany, doing away with all component states. The East German government then divided Brandenburg among several Bezirke or districts. (See Administrative division of the German Democratic Republic). Most of Brandenburg lay within the Bezirke of Cottbus, Frankfurt, or Potsdam, but parts of the former province passed to the Schwerin, Neubrandenburg and Magdeburg districts (town Havelberg). East Germany relied heavily on lignite (the lowest grade of coal) as an energy source, and lignite strip mines marred areas of south-eastern Brandenburg. The industrial towns surrounding Berlin were important to the East German economy, while rural Brandenburg remained mainly agricultural.

Federal Republic of Germany
The present State of Brandenburg was re-established on 3 October 1990 upon German reunification. The newly elected Landtag of Brandenburg first met on 26 October 1990. As in other former parts of East Germany, the lack of modern infrastructure and exposure to West Germany's competitive market economy brought widespread unemployment and economic difficulty. In the recent years, however, Brandenburg's infrastructure has been modernized and unemployment has slowly declined.

Berlin-Brandenburg fusion attempt

The legal basis for a combined state of Berlin and Brandenburg is different from other state fusion proposals. Normally, Article 29 of the Basic Law stipulates that a state fusion requires a federal law. However, a clause added to the Basic Law in 1994, Article 118a, allows Berlin and Brandenburg to unify without federal approval, requiring a referendum and a ratification by both state parliaments.

In 1996, there was an unsuccessful attempt of unifying the states of Berlin and Brandenburg. Both share a common history, dialect and culture and in 2020, there are over 225.000 residents of Brandenburg that commute to Berlin. The fusion had the near-unanimous support by a broad coalition of both state governments, political parties, media, business associations, trade unions and churches. Though Berlin voted in favor by a small margin, largely based on support in former West Berlin, Brandenburg voters disapproved of the fusion by a large margin. It failed largely due to Brandenburg voters not wanting to take on Berlin's large and growing public debt and fearing losing identity and influence to the capital.

Geography

Brandenburg is bordered by Mecklenburg-Vorpommern in the north, Poland in the east, the Freistaat Sachsen in the south, Saxony-Anhalt in the west, and Lower Saxony in the northwest.

The Oder river forms a part of the eastern border, the Elbe river a portion of the western border. The main rivers in the state itself are the Spree and the Havel. In the southeast, there is a wetlands region called the Spreewald; it is the northernmost part of Lusatia, where the Sorbs, a Slavic people, still live. These areas are bilingual, i.e., German and Sorbian are both used.

Protected areas
Brandenburg is known for its well-preserved natural environment and its ambitious natural protection policies which began in the 1990s. 15 large protected areas were designated following Germany's reunification. Each of them is provided with state-financed administration and a park ranger staff, who guide visitors and work to ensure nature conservation. Most protected areas have visitor centers.

National parks
Lower Oder Valley National Park (106 km2)

Biosphere reserves

Spreewald Biosphere Reserve
Schorfheide-Chorin Biosphere Reserve
River Landscape Elbe-Brandenburg Biosphere Reserve

Nature parks
 Barnim Nature Park
 Dahme-Heideseen Nature Park
 High Fläming Nature Park
 Märkische Schweiz Nature Park
 Niederlausitzer Heidelandschaft Nature Park
 Niederlausitzer Landrücken Nature Park
 Nuthe-Nieplitz Nature Park
 Schlaube Valley Nature Parke
 Uckermark Lakes Nature Park
 Westhavelland Nature Park
 Stechlin-Ruppiner Land Nature Park

Demographics 

Brandenburg has the second lowest population density among the German states, after Mecklenburg-Vorpommern.

Development

Religion

17.1% of the Brandenburgers are registered members of the local Evangelical Church in Germany (mostly the Evangelical Church in Berlin, Brandenburg and Silesian Upper Lusatia), while 3.1% are registered with the Roman Catholic Church (mostly the Archdiocese of Berlin, and a minority in the Diocese of Görlitz). The majority (79.8%) of Brandenburgers, whether of Christian or other beliefs, choose not to register with the government as members of these churches, and therefore do not pay the church tax.

Foreign population

Politics 

Politically, Brandenburg is a stronghold of the Social Democratic Party, which won the largest share of the vote and seats in every state election. All three Minister-Presidents of Brandenburg have come from the Social Democratic Party (unlike any other state except Bremen) and they even won an absolute majority of seats and every single-member constituency in the 1994 state election.

On a federal level, the Social Democratic Party has also been the strongest party in most federal elections, their strongholds being the northwestern part of the state and Potsdam and its surrounding areas. However, the Christian Democratic Union won the most votes in 1990, their 2013 landslide and in 2017. In 2009, The Left won the most votes in a year where, like in 2017, the Social Democratic collapsed. Prominent politicians from Brandenburg include Social Democrats Frank-Walter Steinmeier, who served in the Bundestag for Brandenburg before being elected President of Germany, and likely Chancellor of Germany Olaf Scholz, who sits in the Bundestag for Potsdam.

Like in all other New states of Germany, the populist parties The Left and, more recently, the Alternative for Germany are especially strong in Brandenburg.

Brandenburg has 4 out of 69 votes in the Bundesrat and, as of 2021, 25 seats out of 736 in the Bundestag.

Subdivisions

Brandenburg is divided into 14 rural districts (Landkreise) and four urban districts (kreisfreie Städte), shown with their population in 2011:

Government

The most recent election took place on 1 September 2019. A coalition government was formed by the Social Democrats, The Greens, and the Christian Democratic Union led by incumbent Minister-President Dietmar Woidke (SPD), replacing the previous coalition between the Social Democrats and The Left. The next ordinary state election will likely occur in autumn 2024.

Economy
The Gross domestic product (GDP) of the state was 72.9 billion euros in 2018, accounting for 2.2% of German economic output. GDP per capita adjusted for purchasing power was 26,700 euros or 88% of the EU27 average in the same year. The GDP per employee was 91% of the EU average. The GDP per capita was the third lowest of all states in Germany.

The unemployment rate stood at 5.6% in November 2022 and was higher than the German average but lower than the average of Eastern Germany.

Transport
Berlin Schönefeld Airport (IATA code: SXF) was the largest airport in Brandenburg. The airport was a base for Condor, easyJet and Ryanair. In 2016, Schönefeld handled 11,652,922 passengers (an increase of 36.7%).

It was planned to incorporate Schönefeld's existing infrastructure and terminals into the new Berlin Brandenburg Airport (BER), which was not scheduled to open before the end of 2020. The new BER will have an initial capacity of 35–40 million passengers a year. Due to increasing air traffic in Berlin and Brandenburg, plans for airport expansions were in the making, as of 2017.

BER airport is now open and receives over sixty combined passenger, charter and cargo airlines.

Education and research

Higher education

In 2016, around 49,000 students were enrolled in Brandenburg universities and higher education facilities. The largest institution is the University of Potsdam, located southwest of Berlin. In 2019 the state of Brandenburg adopted an Open Access strategy calling on universities to develop transformation strategies to make knowledge from Brandenburg freely accessible to all.

Universities in Brandenburg:
 University of Potsdam
 Brandenburg University of Technology
 European University Viadrina
 Konrad Wolf Film University of Babelsberg
 Medizinische Hochschule Brandenburg Theodor Fontane

Culture

Music
The Brandenburg concerti by Johann Sebastian Bach (original title: Six Concerts à plusieurs instruments) are a collection of six instrumental works presented by Bach to Christian Ludwig, Margrave of Brandenburg-Schwedt, in 1721 (though probably composed earlier). They are widely regarded as among the finest musical compositions of the Baroque era and are among the composer's best known works.

Cuisine

A famous speciality food from Brandenburg are the Spreewald gherkins. The wet soil of the Spreewald makes the region ideal for growing cucumbers. Spreewald gherkins are protected by the EU as a Protected Geographical Indication (PGI). They are one of the biggest exports of Brandenburg.

Notable people

 Wilhelm von Humboldt (1767–1835), philosopher, linguist, diplomat, and founder of the Humboldt University of Berlin
 Heinrich von Kleist (1777–1811), poet, dramatist, and novelist
 Karl Friedrich Schinkel (1781–1841), architect, city planner, and painter
 Peter Joseph Lenné (1789–1866), gardener and landscape architect
 Theodor Fontane (1819–1898), novelist and poet
 Wilhelm Pieck (1876–1960), politician, first President of the German Democratic Republic
Kurt Demmler (1943–2009), songwriter; accused of sexual abuse he hanged himself in his jail cell.
 Wolfgang Joop (born 1944), fashion designer, founder of JOOP!
 Matthias Platzeck (born 1953), politician, Minister President of Brandenburg from 2002 to 2013
 Henry Maske (born 1964), professional boxer
 Paul van Dyk (born 1971), DJ, record producer, and musician
 Britta Steffen (born 1983), competitive swimmer, former Olympic, World, and European champion
 Robert Harting (born 1984), discus thrower, former Olympic, World, and European champion
 Roehl brothers, Charles (1857–1927) and William (1890–1968), businessmen and pioneers of Washington state.
 Mike David Ortmann (born 1999), racing driver

See also

Outline of Germany
 Former countries in Europe after 1815

References

External links

 Official website 
 Official local information system 
 Brandenburg Tourist Board 
 

 
NUTS 1 statistical regions of the European Union
States and territories established in 1990
1990 establishments in Germany
States of Germany